Arab Serai is a 16th century caravanserai within the Humayun's tomb complex at Delhi, India. It is said to have been built by Mughal emperor Humayun's widow Haji Begum. In recent times, it has been conserved by Aga Khan Trust for Culture.

History
According to S.A.A. Naqvi, Mughal emperor Humayun's widow Haji Begum built this serai in 1560 to shelter three hundred Arab mullahs whom she was taking with her during her hajj to Mecca; however, Y.D. Sharma opines that the word Arab in the title is a misnomer as this building was built for the Persian craftsmen and workers who built the Humayun's Tomb.

In January 2017, the Aga Khan Trust for Culture started a project to conserve the serai. The restoration was  completed in November 2018. In March 2019, the trust announced a planned project to conserve the baoli (stepwell) of the serai with the help of funds from the embassy of Germany. This building along with other buildings form the UNESCO World Heritage Site of Humayun's Tomb complex.

Architecture
This building contains arched cells against its enclosure walls. Presently, the cells are in ruins. The northern gate is the only structure of the building which is intact. The gate measures  in height and is made of quartzite with red sandstone and is inlaid by marble. The octagonal shaped gate chamber was crowned by a dome at the time of its construction, but since then the dome has collapsed. A balcony window is present over the arch of the main gateway and is supported by six brackets. On each side of the gateway at the same level, more balcony windows crowned by a pyramidal dome are present. The domes are covered with yellow and blue tiles.

The sarai houses two more gateways - one on the east side and another on the west.  According to an inscription at the eastern gateway, the eastern gateway actually served as an entrance to a market and was built by a man named Mihr Banu during the reign of Jahangir. The market also contains arched rooms which are presently in ruins.

Gallery

References

Bibliography
 

Mughal caravanserais
World Heritage Sites in India
1560 establishments in India
Monuments of National Importance in Delhi
Caravanserais in India